Samuel Gbadebo Adegboyega, MON (1 April 1896 – 23 October 1979) was a Nigerian Christian clergyman widely regarded as one of the founding fathers of Pentecostalism in Nigeria. He is the first territorial chairman of the Lagos and Western/Northern Areas Territory (LAWNA) field of The Apostolic Church Nigeria.

Life
Born into a royal family from Owu Kingdom in Abeokuta, Ogun State, Nigeria, Adegboyega attended Methodist High School, Abeokuta where he completed his secondary education. He got employed at the Nigerian Railway Corporation and rose through the ranks to become station master before becoming a full-time Christian minister at a Methodist church in 1916 until 1920. In that year, he joined The Precious Stone Church, which later affiliated itself with the Faith Tabernacle Congregation of Philadelphia.

During the revival that took place in 1930 at the Nigerian chapter of Faith Tabernacle Congregation, Adegboyega was adopted as a member of the Apostolic Church, a Christian group from the United Kingdom who were invited by Faith Tabernacle during the revival. He later became one of the central figures who helped spread The Apostolic Church Nigeria throughout the country and beyond following a split by secessionists, who founded Christ Apostolic Church in 1941.

Death
He died on October 23, 1979, at the convention ground of The Apostolic Church Nigeria in Lagos State, Nigeria.

Personal life
He was married to Felicia Adegboyega née Olowe, with whom he had five children.

Recognition
During the celebration of Nigeria's independence in 1960, he was conferred with the national honor of Member of the Niger (MON). In 2011, Samuel Adegboyega University was founded by The Apostolic Church Nigeria in his memory.

References

1896 births
1979 deaths
Nigerian Christian clergy
Yoruba royalty
People from Abeokuta
Nigerian Pentecostal pastors